Detskaya Literatura (lit. "Children's Literature"), formerly Detgiz and DETIZDAT, is a Soviet and Russian publishing house for children's literature. It was established on September 9, 1933 by the Communist Party of the Soviet Union on the basis of Molodaya Gvardiya's children's imprint.

The company was initially called Detgiz (lit. "The State Children's Publishing House"). The company had offices in Moscow and Leningrad.  The first chief editor was Samuil Marshak. In 1933 Detgiz published 168 titles. In 1937 the headquarters of Detgiz was destroyed, some employees (such as Lydia Chukovskaya) were fired, others were arrested, imprisoned or executed by a firing squad.

The publisher's name was changed numerous times, from Detgiz (1933) to DETIZDAT (1936) to Detgiz again (1941) to Detskaya Literatura (1963). In 1991 the publishing house was divided into the Moscow department, called Detskaya Literatura, and the Saint Petersburg department, called Lyceum or "Lyceum: The State Republican Publishing House for Children and Youth Literature", which later became DETGIZ.

Book series

 My First Books
 One Book After Another
 The World Literature Library for Children and Youth
 School Library
 Library of Adventures and Science Fiction
 Learn and Know How
 Library of a Pioneer
 Library of Adventures
 People. Times. Ideas
 Golden Library
 Schoolboy's Military Library

References

External links
 The official website of the Moscow department  
 The official website of the Saint Petersburg department 

Publishing companies of the Soviet Union
Book publishing companies of Russia
Publishing companies established in 1933
Children's book publishers
Companies based in Moscow